Child art is the drawings, paintings, or other artistic works created by children. The term was coined by Franz Cižek in the 1890s. The art of each child reflects their level of self-awareness and the degree to which they are integrated with their environment.

"Child art"
In its primary sense the term was created by Franz Cižek (1865–1946) in the 1890s.

The term "child art" also has a parallel and different usage in the world of contemporary fine art, where it refers to a subgenre of artists who depict children in their works.

Third connotation of "child art" implies art intended for viewing by children, say illustrations in a book for juvenile readers. Such art could be done by a child or a professional adult illustrator.

History
Premises for understanding of importance of art for children were laid by J.-J. Rousseau (1712–78), J.H. Pestalozzi (1746–1827), John Ruskin (1819–1900), and Herbert Spencer (1820–1903).

Agenda of art education for children was discussed at the International Conference of 1884, held in London at the Health Exhibition. The discussion framework was largely shaped by the widespread of schools of design for professional training of children and youth in the UK, beginning from 1852. Some of the conference participants underlined importance of creativity, imaginations and special methodology for development of children's artistic skills. Ebenezer Cooke (1837–1913) has pointed out that "if a child follows its bent and draws animals its own way, in action, and repeats them, outlines them, and colours them too, he will produce a drawing which may be comparable to the archaic period of more than one historic school." The proceedings of the conference, ed. by E. Cooke, were issued in the 1885–86 Journal of Education, published by the Society for the Development of the Science of Education.

First European exhibition of drawings by children was organized by Robert Ablett (1848–1945) in London, 1890. The first collection of 1250 children's drawing and sculpture pieces was assembled by Corrado Ricci (1858–1934), an Italian art historian.

Aesthetic appreciation of children's art as untainted by adult influence was extolled by Franz Cižek, who called a child's drawing "a marvelous and precious document". Discovery of the aesthetic quality of the unskilled visual expression by children was related to the aesthetics of modernism and, in case of Cižek, to the Vienna Secession.

In 1897, Cižek opened the Juvenile Art Class, a weekend school upholding children creativity uninhibited by adult vocational standards. The initiative was supported by his Secession friends-artists and opposed by the traditional art teachers. The Class accepted pupils of 2 to 14 years old for two hours a week, free of charge, with no selection. Cižek claimed that he was working "as an artist, not as a teacher", and actually "learned and not taught". In the work, the theory of developmental stages was propagated.

Psychologists' interest in children's art was reflected in works by Georg Kerschensteiner (Die Entwickelung der Zeichnerischen Begabung, 1905, on the grounds of analysis of some 100 000 drawings), Georges-Henri Luquet (Les Dessins D’un Enfant, 1912, using 1500 drawings of the author's daughter from 3 to 8 years old), Georges Rouma (Le Langage Graphique de l’Enfant, Paris, 1913), Karl Bühler (1918 ff.), Florence Goodenough, Helga Eng, Robert Coles. According to D.D. Kelly, consequent domination of Piagetian theory of cognitive psychology largely marginalized the psychological studies of children's art, which were revitalized only towards the end of the 20th century.

Stages of child art
As the child develops, their art passes through a number of stages. Four of them were for the first time defined by E. Cooke, under influence of Herbert Spencer's evolutionary theory.

Presently, the stages are generally differentiated as follows:

Scribbling

From about their first birthday children achieve the fine motor control to handle a crayon. At first they scribble. The youngest child scribbles with a series of left and right motions, later up, down and then circular motions are added. The child appears to get considerable pleasure from watching the line or the colours appear. Often however children do not pay attention to the edges of the page and the lines go beyond the confines of the page.  Children are often also interested in body painting and, given the opportunity, will draw on their hands or smear paint on their faces.

Later, from about their second birthday, controlled scribbling starts. Children produce patterns of simple shapes: circles, crosses and star-bursts. They also become interested in arrangement and can produce simple collages of coloured paper, or place stones in patterns. Once children have established controlled scribbling they begin to name their scribbles.

Pre-symbolism

From about age three, the child begins to combine circles and lines to make simple figures. At first, people are drawn without a body and with arms emerging directly from the head. The eyes are often drawn large, filling up most of the face, and hands and feet are omitted. At this stage it may be impossible to identify the subject of the art without the child's help.

Later drawings from this stage show figures drawn floating in space and sized to reflect the child's view of their importance. Most children at this age are not concerned with producing a realistic picture.

Symbolism

In this stage of a child's development, they create a vocabulary of images. Thus when a child draws a picture of a cat, they will always draw the same basic image, perhaps modified (one cat has stripes while another has dots, for example). This stage of drawing begins at around age five. The basic shapes are called symbols or schema.

Each child develops their own set of symbols, which are based on their understanding of what is being drawn rather than on observation. Each child's symbols are therefore unique to the child. By this age, most children develop a "person" symbol which has a properly defined head, trunk and limbs which are in some sort of rough proportion.

Before this stage the objects that child would draw would appear to float in space, but at about five to six years old the child introduces a baseline with which to organize their space. This baseline is often a green line (representing grass) at the bottom of the paper. The figures stand on this line. Slightly older children may also add secondary baselines for background objects and a skyline to hold the sun and clouds.

It is at this stage that cultural influences become more important. Children not only draw from life, but also copy images in their surroundings. They may draw copies of cartoons. Children also become more aware of the story-telling possibilities in a picture. The earliest understanding of a more realistic representation of space, such as using perspective, usually comes from copying.

Realism
As children mature they begin to find their symbols limiting. They realize that their schema for a person is not flexible enough, and just doesn't look like the real thing. At this stage, which begins at nine or ten years old, the child will lend greater importance to whether the drawing looks like the object being drawn.
This can be a frustrating time for some children, as their aspirations outstrip their abilities and knowledge. Some children give up on drawing almost entirely. However others become skilled, and it is at this stage that formal artistic training can benefit the child most. The baseline is dropped and the child can learn to use rules such as perspective to organize space better. Story-telling also becomes more refined and children will start to use formal devices such as the comic strip.

Therapeutic
Art therapy can be an effective way for children to develop and connect with their emotions. Some children with autism have found that drawing can help them to express feelings that they have difficulty expressing otherwise. Similarly children who have faced horrors such as war can find it difficult to talk about what they have experienced directly. Art can help children come to terms with their emotions in these situations.

Criticism
After visiting a children's art display in San Francisco in the 1980s, educator John Holt stated that, "...An understanding of adultism might begin to explain what I mean when I say that much of what is known as children's art is an adult invention."

Reliability 
Children's reliability of children's art as evidence of their experiences is a matter of professional debate. In recent years courts around the world have become increasingly accepting of children's art being submitted as evidence. In 2004 the International Criminal Court accepted a group of approximately 500 children's drawings as evidence during investigations of crimes against humanity committed during the War in Darfur.

Children's art as historical evidence 
Children's art is also a valued source for historians seeking to understand children's lives in the past. In some instances, children's art can provide insight into their experiences. In 1945, the Swiss Red Cross encouraged children liberated from Auschwitz to draw pictures. Some of those drawings have been used by historian Nicholas Stargardt to construct Jewish children's experiences in concentration camps. Historian Jack Hodgson argues that children's art will always come with ambiguity owing to the "need to interpret them" and that is often off-putting to discipline that remains logocentric, "thriving on precise textual details." However, Hodgson advocates for their use due to "enormous communicative potential", particularly regarding "unquantifiable feelings or emotions."

See also
 Child psychology
 Childhood development of fine motor skills
 Naïve art
 Outsider art
 PapaInk
 Wang Yani
 Visual arts

Further reading
 Anna Stetsenko (1995). "The psychological functions of children's drawing: A Vygotskian perspective". In C. Lange-Küttner & G. V. Thomas (Eds.), Drawing and Looking (pp. 147–158). New York etc.: Harvester Wheatsheaf. (Also in Italian: "La funzione psicologica del disegno infantile: una prospettiva Vygotskiana" (2000). In Bambini, Anno XVI, n. 4, pp. 19–31. Translation and foreword by Prof. Mariolina Bartolini-Bussi)
 Arlene E. Richards. "The history of developmental stages of child art: 1857 to 1921". 1974.
 Kelly, Donna Darling. Uncovering the History of Children's Drawing and Art. Greenwood Publishing Group, 2004.
 Thorpe, Deborah Ellen. "Young hands, old books: Drawings by children in a fourteenth-century manuscript, LJS MS. 361",  Cogent Arts & Humanities (2016), 3: 1196864.

References

External links

 Longitudinal study (N = 1) of drawing.

 
Articles containing video clips